The Chase Australia is an Australian television quiz show based on the British program of the same name. It is broadcast on the Seven Network and premiered on 14 September 2015. Four contestants play against an opponent, known as the "chaser", who plays for the bank. The show was originally hosted by Andrew O'Keefe until July 2021, when he was replaced by Larry Emdur. The series began with Brydon Coverdale, Anne Hegerty, Matt Parkinson and Issa Schultz as chasers, with Mark Labbett joining in 2016. Shaun Wallace appeared as a guest chaser in 2018, and Cheryl Toh has appeared as a chaser since 2019. Mara Lejins joined as a chaser in 2022.

The series has also spawned a prime-time celebrity series, and a spin-off called Beat The Chasers.

History
In mid-2014 it was reported that the Seven Network had considered producing a local version of The Chase on the back of good ratings for the British version of the show which has been airing in the 3:00 pm timeslot since August 2013. A pilot episode on the UK set was made, but ultimately it was decided not to proceed.

However, interest in a local version was renewed in May 2015 and in July the Seven Network commissioned the show to eventually replace Deal or No Deal and Million Dollar Minute in the 5:00 pm timeslot in a bid to revive ratings for its struggling 6:00 pm nightly news.

From June 2020, social distancing measures were applied on set due to the COVID-19 pandemic, with contestants spaced apart from each other. In August 2020, it was announced that beginning with the spin-off, Beat The Chasers, production of The Chase Australia would move from Melbourne to Sydney in September 2020 due to COVID restrictions in Victoria at the time.

On 2 February 2021, Seven announced that the network did not renew host Andrew O'Keefe's contract in December 2020 and parted company with him after he was charged with domestic violence. On 22 February 2021, it was announced that Larry Emdur would replace O'Keefe as host of the program, with future episodes to continue to be recorded in Sydney. The final new episode with O'Keefe as host aired on 20 July 2021. Episodes with Emdur as host began airing from 26 July 2021.

Gameplay

Cash Builder and Head-to-Head rounds
Each contestant plays the first two rounds alone. In the first round, the "Cash Builder", they have one minute to answer as many questions as possible, earning $2,000 per correct answer. Next, the contestant faces the day's chaser in a head-to-head contest, attempting to move the money down to the bottom of a seven-step gameboard and into the team bank ("home"). They may start three steps down from the top (giving a three-step head start and requiring five correct answers to reach home) and play for the money earned in the Cash Builder, start one step farther down for a lesser award, or start one step farther up for a greater award. The latter two awards are stated by the chaser; since 2016, lesser awards can be zero or even negative.

Once the contestant chooses a starting position, the host begins to ask a series of questions with three answer options. The contestant and chaser separately lock in their guesses on keypads; once either person locks in, the other must do so within five seconds or be locked out for that turn. A correct answer moves the person who gave it one step down the board, but a miss or lock-out leaves them in place. If the contestant reaches home without being caught, they advance to the Final Chase and their money is added to the team's prize fund (or deducted, if they chose to play for a negative amount). If the chaser catches up, the contestant is eliminated and their money is forfeited.

If all four contestants lose their head-to-head chases, the team nominate one contestant to play for them for an amount of money offered by the chaser in the Final Chase.

Final Chase round
The remaining contestants now must work together to avoid being caught by the chaser. They blindly choose one of two question sets for themselves during the final commercial break, with the other set put aside for the chaser, and then have two minutes to answer as many questions as possible on the buzzer. Each correct answer moves the team ahead one step, and they are given a head start of one step per contestant participating in the round. Only the contestant who buzzes-in may answer or pass, and may not confer with their teammates; if a contestant responds without buzzing-in, the answer is automatically ruled wrong. The buzzer is not used if only one contestant is in the Final Chase. The host will only ask a new question once someone has buzzed in and either answered or passed. Unlike the original British version, the chaser remains onstage to witness the team's performance.

The chaser then has two minutes to answer questions from the unused set, moving one step ahead per correct response. If the chaser passes or misses, the clock is briefly stopped and the team is given a chance to discuss it and respond. A correct answer pushes the chaser back one step, or moves the team ahead by one if the chaser is at the starting line. If the chaser catches the team before time runs out, the prize fund is lost and all four contestants leave with nothing. If the chaser fails to catch the team, the participating contestants split the prize fund equally.

Half-hour format
Half-hour episodes have occasionally aired due to Seven's commitments to air various sporting events (including Spring Racing Carnival and the 2020 Summer Olympics - the latter of which being Emdur's premiere as host). These episodes feature two contestants instead of four. Each contestant plays the cash builder round, and the contestant that earns the higher amount of money takes the combined total of the two contestants to the gameboard for the head-to-head. If both contestants earn the same amount in the cash builder, the pair chooses which contestant will play head-to-head. If the contestant makes it back to the bank, the Final Chase is played as normal. If the contestant is caught in the head-to-head, the team nominate one contestant to play for them for an amount of money offered by the chaser in the Final Chase.

Special episodes
Special shows featuring shortened gameplay have featured during Saturday Night Footy, Sunrise, Fifi, Dave & Fev and The Morning Show.

In February and March 2017, four specials aired featuring two teams from the eighth season of My Kitchen Rules playing for a home viewer.

Celebrity specials
A weekly prime-time version of the show began airing on Seven from 21 August to 25 September 2019, entitled The Chase Celebrity Specials Australia (informally known as The Celebrity Chase). In it, teams of celebrities compete against the chaser to win prize money for their chosen charities. The game is played in the same way as the regular version. If a celebrity does not make it to the Final Chase, or if the team is caught during the Final Chase, a consolation prize is awarded to the charities for each celebrity. Unlike the regular version, the series is filmed in front of a studio audience.

In February 2022, a celebrity episode aired in the regular 5:00 pm timeslot to promote Dancing with the Stars. This was produced without a studio audience like the regular version.

Chasers

Notes
 Hegerty and Labbett were unable to get visas authorising them to travel from Britain to Australia, due to border closures implemented as a result of the COVID-19 pandemic in March 2020.
 Hegerty returned to Australia to film during May 2021, with her first episode since June 2020 aired on 28 July 2021.
 Labbett briefly featured in the advertisement for Season 10, but was not listed in the list of chasers in Seven's press release for Season 10 of The Chase Australia. Labbett joined ABC's version of The Chase USA in May 2021.  Labbett's contract on the American version was not renewed by ABC in 2022 and rejoined the Australian version for Season 11 in February 2022.

Ratings
Since debuting in September 2015, The Chase Australia has generally performed well in the ratings, often beating the Nine Network's Millionaire Hot Seat and Network Ten's 10 News First in the important 5:00 to 6:00 pm timeslot. The debut episode drew 520,000 for its first half-hour, and 720,000 for its second half-hour which went up against Millionaire Hot Seat. This was a key factor in Seven News regaining its crown as Australia's most-watched news service, but, as of September 2017, it continues to trail Nine News across the eastern seaboard, while it still leads comfortably in the Adelaide and Perth markets.

In response to continued strong ratings for The Chase Australia throughout 2016, the Nine Network announced rival game show Millionaire Hot Seat would extend to one hour from 2017, meaning both shows compete for the same duration. As of May 2017, The Chase Australia remains well ahead of Millionaire Hot Seat in the ratings, often winning by an average margin of 100,000.

Beat The Chasers
In August 2020, it was announced that an Australian version of Beat The Chasers would be produced. This version includes all the local Chasers of the series: Brydon Coverdale, Issa Schultz, Matt Parkinson and Cheryl Toh, as contestants try to beat them in order to win big cash prizes. The series premiered on 1 November 2020 and aired on Sunday nights at 7:00 p.m. for five consecutive weeks.

A single contestant plays the Cash Builder round, answering a series of multiple-choice questions worth $1,000 each. The round ends once they either miss a question or get five right; a miss on the first question immediately eliminates the contestant with no winnings. They must then decide how many chasers from two to four to face in a timed head-to-head round, with the chasers specifying a time limit for themselves (up to a maximum of 60 seconds) and offering larger cash prizes as an incentive to face more of them. The offer to face two chasers is always equal to the amount earned in the Cash Builder.

The contestant's clock is set to 60 seconds, while the chasers' clock is set to their agreed-on time. Only one clock runs at any given moment, starting with the contestant; the side in control must answer a question correctly to stop their clock and turn control over to the opposing side. The chasers must buzz-in to respond and may not confer on any questions. The contestant wins the money on offer if the chasers' clock runs out first, or nothing if their clock runs out.

Unlike the original British version, the Australian version of Beat the Chasers utilises a tournament format. The seven contestants with the highest cash winnings after the first four episodes are invited to return for a final showdown against the chasers in the fifth. The final follows the same rules, with some changes:

 Cash Builder questions are worth $5,000 each.
 A miss on the first question eliminates the contestant with only their winnings from the preliminary heats.
 For the head-to-head, the contestant must wager some portion of their heats winnings, which is added to their Cash Builder total.
 The contestant faces all four chasers and must choose one of three money/time offers.
 If the contestant loses, they forfeit the portion of their heats winnings that they risked.

On 12 April 2021, it was reported that Seven has commissioned a second season of Beat The Chasers with Larry Emdur as presenter.  It was also announced that Seven were negotiating for Anne Hegerty to join the four Australian chasers for the second season.

Transmissions

Notes

The Chase Australia airs at 5:00 p.m. on weeknights in most markets, however, on the Gold Coast it airs at 4:30 pm due to Seven Gold Coast News airing at 5:30 p.m. It also airs at 4:30 in all of Regional and Remote Western Australia because of GWN7 Local News broadcasting statewide except Perth at 5:30 p.m. Until July 2021, episodes have typically been repeated on Fridays from March 2016 and Thursdays from October 2019.  Occasionally Wednesdays sees repeat episodes. Episodes have also aired at 7:30 p.m. on 10 January and 13 January 2016, and on Sundays at 5:00 p.m. in February 2016. Two of the My Kitchen Rules specials aired at 7:30 p.m in February 2017, with the remaining two airing at 5:00 p.m..

International transmissions
In New Zealand, episodes of The Chase Australia originally aired weekly on TVNZ 1 and now airs on TVNZ Duke. On 14 March 2016, The Chase Australia began airing on UK TV channel Challenge, also available in Ireland, but this has since stopped.

Merchandise
A localised version of the iOS and Android game from Barnstorm Games was released. The app features five chasers (excluding Cheryl 'Tiger Mum' Toh, whom had not yet appeared on the programme at the time of release) and can be played by up to four people, as in the actual show. There is one significant difference between the show and the app; only three choices are presented for questions in the Cash Builder and Final Chase rounds, and no Final Chase is played if all the players are caught in their individual chases.

On 8 February 2016, a board game version was released by Crown and Andrews. It features three of the chasers: Issa, Brydon, and Matt. Another edition of the board game was released by Imagination Games in 2019.

References

2015 Australian television series debuts
2010s Australian game shows
2020s Australian game shows
English-language television shows
Seven Network original programming
Television shows set in Melbourne
Television shows set in Sydney
Television series by ITV Studios
Australian television series based on British television series